The 2010 German motorcycle Grand Prix was the eighth round of the 2010 Grand Prix motorcycle racing season. It took place on the weekend of 16–18 July 2010 at the Sachsenring, located in Hohenstein-Ernstthal, Germany.

MotoGP classification
After a four-round absence due to a broken leg sustained at the Mugello Circuit, Valentino Rossi made his return to the MotoGP grid. A crash between Randy de Puniet, Álvaro Bautista and Aleix Espargaró caused the race to be red-flagged on the 10th lap. All three riders were eligible to make the restart as the results of the first race go back to the last lap therefore showing the riders being classified. However they failed to return to the pits with their bike within five minutes of the race being stopped and therefore were not allowed to make the restart. Colin Edwards retired from the first race before the race was stopped and was ineligible to restart the race.
The restarted race was shortened to 21 laps, and grid positions for the second race was based on the classification of the first race.

Moto2 classification

125 cc classification

Championship standings after the race (MotoGP)
Below are the standings for the top five riders and constructors after round eight has concluded.

Riders' Championship standings

Constructors' Championship standings

 Note: Only the top five positions are included for both sets of standings.

References

German motorcycle Grand Prix
German
Motorcycle Grand Prix
July 2010 sports events in Germany